The British XXIII Corps was a British infantry corps during World War I.

History 
British XXII Corps was formed in the UK in February 1918 as a Home Forces formation to reinforce units in France.

General Officers Commanding
Commanders included:
 16 February – 7 May 1918 Lieutenant-General Sir William Pulteney
 7 May – 5 August 1918 Lieutenant-General Sir Thomas Snow (temporary)
 5 August 1918 – April 1919 Lieutenant-General Sir William Pulteney

References

British field corps
Corps of the British Army in World War I